Seven Buttresses is a series of seven rock buttresses, 150 m high, which are separated by narrow icefalls and extend for 4 nautical miles (7 km) along the west side of Tabarin Peninsula, the east extremity of Trinity Peninsula. Probably first sighted by a party under J. Gunnar Andersson of the Swedish Antarctic Expedition, 1901–04. The Seven Buttresses were surveyed and named by the Falkland Islands Dependencies Survey (FIDS), 1946.

Rock formations of the Trinity Peninsula